A rational agent or rational being is a person or entity that always aims to perform optimal actions based on given premises and information. A rational agent can be anything that makes decisions, typically a person, firm, machine, or software.

The concept of rational agents can be found in various disciplines such as artificial intelligence, cognitive science, decision theory, economics, ethics, game theory, and the study of practical reason.

Economics

In reference to economics, rational agent refers to hypothetical consumers and how they make decisions in a free market. This concept is one of the assumptions made in neoclassical economic theory. The concept of economic rationality arises from a tradition of marginal analysis used in neoclassical economics. The idea of a rational agent is important to the philosophy of utilitarianism, as detailed by philosopher Jeremy Bentham's theory of the felicific calculus, also known as the hedonistic calculus.

The action a rational agent takes depends on:
 the preferences of the agent
 the agent's information of its environment, which may come from past experiences
 the actions, duties and obligations available to the agent
 the estimated or actual benefits and the chances of success of the actions.

In game theory and classical economics, it is often assumed that the actors, people, and firms are rational.  However, the extent to which people and firms behave rationally is subject to debate.  Economists often assume the models of rational choice theory and bounded rationality to formalize and predict the behavior of individuals and firms.  Rational agents sometimes behave in manners that are counter-intuitive to many people, as in the traveler's dilemma.

Criticisms  
Many economic theories reject utilitarianism and rational agency, especially those that might be considered heterodox.

For example, Thorstein Veblen, known as the father of institutional economics, rejects the notion of hedonistic calculus and pure rationality saying: "The hedonistic conception of man is that of a lightning calculator of pleasures and pains who oscillates like a homogeneous globule of desire of happiness under the impulse of stimuli that shift him about the area, but leave him intact."

Veblen instead perceives human economic decisions as the result of multiple complex cumulative factors: "It is the characteristic of man to do something, not simply to suffer pleasures and pains through the impact of suitable forces. He is ... a coherent structure of propensities and habits which seeks realization and expression in an unfolding activity. ... They are the products of his hereditary traits and his past experience, cumulatively wrought out under a given body of traditions conventionalities, and material circumstances; and they afford the point of departure for the next step in the process. The economic life history of the individual is a cumulative process of adaptation of means to ends that cumulatively change as the process goes on, both the agent and his environment being at any point the outcome of the last process."
Evolutionary economics also provides criticisms of the Rational Agent, citing the "parental bent" (the idea that biological impulses can and do frequently override rational decision making based on utility). Arguments against rational agency have also cited the enormous influence of marketing as proof that humans can be persuaded to make economic decisions that are "non-rational" in nature.

Alternate theories 
Neuroeconomics is a concept that uses neuroscience, social psychology and other fields of science to better understand how people make decisions.  Unlike rational agent theory, neuroeconomics does not attempt to predict large-scale human behavior but rather how individuals make decisions in case-by-case scenarios.

Artificial intelligence
Artificial intelligence has borrowed the term "rational agents" from economics to describe autonomous programs that are capable of goal directed behavior. Today there is a considerable overlap between AI research, game theory and decision theory. Rational agents in AI are closely related to intelligent agents, autonomous software programs that display intelligence.

See also

Economics
 Agent (economics)
 Homo economicus
 TOTREP

Software
 Intelligent agent
 Software agent

References

Economics and game theory

Artificial intelligence
 

Artificial intelligence
Concepts in ethics
Concepts in the philosophy of mind
Game theory
Neoclassical economics
Philosophical concepts
Reasoning
Management theory